The Mighty Angel is a 2014 Polish drama film directed by Wojciech Smarzowski based on a book of the same name by Jerzy Pilch. It won Best Actor Award during 27th Tokyo International Film Festival.

Cast 
 Robert Więckiewicz - Jerzy
 Julia Kijowska - She
 Adam Woronowicz - He
 Jacek Braciak - Columbus
 Lech Dyblik - Leader
 Arkadiusz Jakubik - Terrorist
 Iwona Wszolkówna - Joanna
 Kinga Preis - Mania
 Iwona Bielska - Queen of Kent
 Marian Dziedziel - Moonshine King
 Krzysztof Kiersznowski - Engineer
 Marcin Dorociński - Borys
 Izabela Kuna - Katarzyna
 Andrzej Grabowski - Dr. Granada
 Sebastian Fabijański - young Engineer
 Monika Dorota - Nurse

References

External links 

2014 drama films
Polish drama films

Films about alcoholism